Timeless is the eighth studio album by American country music singer Martina McBride.

The album is an 18-track collection of classic country cover songs. Major artists whose songs were covered include Eddy Arnold, Johnny Cash, Don Gibson, Loretta Lynn, Buck Owens, Ray Price, Hank Snow, Hank Williams, Tammy Wynette and many others.  The album debuted at No. 1 on the country album chart and No. 3 on the Billboard 200.

The album became McBride's fastest-selling of her career and gave her her best debut sales week with 185,000 copies sold in its first week. In the U.S., the album was certified gold and platinum on December 12, 2005 by the RIAA.

Track listing

Personnel 
 Martina McBride – lead vocals, harmony vocals 
 Gordon Mote – acoustic piano, Wurlitzer electric piano, Hammond B3 organ
 Steve Gibson – acoustic guitar, electric guitars, dobro, mandolin
 Marty Schiff – acoustic guitar
 Paul Worley – acoustic guitar
 Stuart Duncan – mandolin, fiddle
 Paul Franklin – dobro, steel guitar
 Larry Paxton – electric bass, upright bass, tic-tac bass
 Glenn Worf – electric bass, upright bass
 Eddie Bayers – drums
 Jonathan Yudkin – strings (11), string arrangements (11)
 Lisa Cochran – harmony vocals
 Melodie Crittenden – harmony vocals
 Jon Mark Ivey – harmony vocals
 Marabeth Jordan – harmony vocals
 John Wesley Ryles – harmony vocals
 Russell Terrell – harmony vocals
 Bergen White – harmony vocals, vocal arrangements

Guest Vocals
 Dan Tyminski – vocals (2)
 Rhonda Vincent – vocals (2)
 Dolly Parton – harmony vocals (12)
 Dwight Yoakam – harmony vocals (13)

The Nashville String Machine
 Dennis Burnside – string arrangements and conductor 
 Carl Gorodetzky – contractor 
 Anthony LaMarchina and Sarighani Reist – cello 
 Jim Grosjean, Gary Vanosdale and Kristin Wilkinson – viola 
 David Angell, Janet Askey, David Davidson, Conni Ellisor, Carl Gorodetzky, Cate Myer, Pamela Sixfin, Christian Teal, Alan Umstead, Cathy Umstead, Mary Kathryn Vanosdale and Karen Winklemann – violin

Production 
 Martina McBride – producer 
 John McBride – recording, mixing, management 
 John Netti – recording assistant, mix assistant 
 Vance Powell – recording assistant, mix assistant 
 Lowell Reynolds – recording assistant, mix assistant 
 David Robinson – recording assistant, mix assistant 
 Michael Dumas – vocal recording for Dwight Yoakam (13)
 Richard Dodd – mastering at RichardDodd.com (Nashville, Tennessee)
 Paige Connors – production coordinator 
 S. Wade Hunt – art direction, design 
 Andrew Eccles – photography 
 Sam Erickson – studio photography 
 Claudia Fowler – wardrobe stylist 
 Earl Cox – hair stylist 
 Mary Beth Felts – make-up
 Bruce Allen – management

Charts

Weekly charts

Year-end charts

Singles

Certifications 
In 2005, the RIAA gave Timeless a platinum certification.

References 

2005 albums
Martina McBride albums
RCA Records albums
Covers albums